Mark Newton may refer to:
 Mark Newton (politician) (born 1960), member of the Georgia House of Representatives
 Mark Charan Newton (born 1981), British fantasy author
 Mark J. Newton, child sexual abuser, see Mark J. Newton and Peter Truong